16 Air Assault Brigade Combat Team, from 1999 to 2021 16 Air Assault Brigade, is a formation of the British Army based in Colchester in the county of Essex. It is the Army's rapid response airborne formation and is the only brigade in the British Army focused on delivering air assault operations.

History

Formation
The brigade was formed as part of the defence reforms implemented by the Strategic Defence Review on 1 September 1999, by the merging of 24 Airmobile Brigade and elements of 5th Airborne Brigade. This grouping created a highly mobile brigade of parachute units and airmobile units, which employ helicopters.

Macedonia
After a ceasefire was declared in the Republic of Macedonia (now known as the Republic of North Macedonia) between government forces and rebels known as the National Liberation Army, NATO launched a British-led effort, Operation Essential Harvest, to collect weapons voluntarily given up by the rebels. The brigade HQ and some of its elements deployed in August 2001, acting as the spearhead for the NATO operation. It returned home after the NATO mission was successfully completed in September.

Afghanistan
After the invasion of Afghanistan in 2001, NATO established a peacekeeping force in December known as the International Security Assistance Force (ISAF), based in the capital Kabul. The brigade HQ and some of its units deployed to Afghanistan in 2001, 2006, 2008 and again in 2010–11. 16th Air Assault Brigade has deployed to Afghanistan more times than any other formation. Following Taliban gains across the country, the brigade returned to Kabul in August 2021 to ensure the safe evacuation of British nationals as part of Operation Pitting.

Iraq
During the build-up to the invasion of Iraq, the brigade, commanded by Brigadier Jacko Page, was deployed to Kuwait in February 2003. The brigade was part of 1 (UK) Armoured Division and after extensive training in Kuwait it took part in the beginning of the invasion on 20 March. The brigade's objective was to secure the southern oil fields before they were destroyed by Saddam Hussein's forces. The brigade's 7th Parachute Regiment, Royal Horse Artillery entered Iraq on 20 March to support U.S. Marine Corps forces in their efforts to capture the Rumaila oil fields, nearly all of the oil wells being taken intact. The rest of the brigade, supported by its AAC helicopters, entered Iraq soon afterwards, still tasked with securing Rumaila. The brigade often met sporadic resistance and had to deal with disarming the many explosives attached to the infrastructure.

The brigade was subsequently used to guard the oil fields and protect Allied supply lines with elements moving further north of Basra – Iraq's second largest city – to provide a screen protecting it from Iraqi attack. On 31 March, the brigade, assisted by artillery and air support, attacked an Iraqi armoured column advancing on Basra, destroying 17 T-55 tanks, 5 artillery pieces and 7 armoured personnel carriers. After British forces entered Basra on 6 April 3 PARA was employed to clear the 'old quarter' of the city on 7 April due to the narrow streets making it inaccessible to vehicles.

After Basra's capture, the brigade was based in Maysan Province, centred around the province's capital Al-Amarah. The brigade carried out patrols into towns, helped bring normality back to the south, tried to maintain order and destroyed any conventional weapons caches that were found. The war was officially declared over on 1 May and the brigade began to return home that same month. During one patrol into Majar al-Kabir on 24 June, the brigade suffered its largest casualties in Iraq when six Royal Military Policemen of 156 Provost Company were killed by a large Iraqi mob.

Future 
Under the Defence in a Competitive Age programme and subsequent Future Soldier, the brigade will be redesignated as the 16th Air Assault Brigade Combat Team.  At the same time, the 1st Battalion, Royal Irish Regiment will re-join the brigade after a 8 year hiatus.

Structure

As the British Army's rapid response formation, 16 Air Assault Brigade has served in the vanguard of all of the Army's recent operational deployments to Sierra Leone, Macedonia, Iraq and Afghanistan, and is the largest brigade in the Army, with 6,200 personnel. It comprises:
 three airborne infantry battalions
 one air assault infantry battalion
 one light recce strike infantry battalion
 one airborne close support artillery regiment
 one close support air manoeuvre engineer regiment
 one air assault logistics regiment
 one air manoeuvre medical regiment
 one Communication and Information Support squadron
 the Pathfinder Platoon

The brigade HQ is based in Colchester Garrison and reports directly to Commander Field Army whilst the Army Air Corps units previously assigned to the brigade will remain under Joint Helicopter Command.

The Brigade Headquarters has personnel from both the British Army and the Royal Air Force assigned, enabling it to carry out air and land operations.

Due to the brigade's mobile role, it is lightly armed and equipped. The brigade's land equipment includes Scimitars, WMIK Land Rovers, Supacats, towed L118 105 mm light guns, Javelin anti-tank and lightweight Starstreak air-defence missile launchers. The aviation element of the brigade consists of three attack regiments equipped with WAH-64 Apache and Lynx helicopters from the Army Air Corps, Chinook and Puma support helicopters from the RAF, and Merlin support helicopters from the Fleet Air Arm (all of which are controlled by Joint Helicopter Command). Furthermore, two four-man Tactical Air Control Parties (TACPs) manned by the RAF Regiment provide airspace deconfliction, integration of air platforms within the battlespace, and terminal control of air assets.

Pathfinder Platoon

In 1984, 5th Airborne Brigade was in the process of developing its Limited Parachute Assault Capability (LPAC). This required a formation of 15 Hercules aircraft to drop a parachute battalion group over two drop zones (DZs) in under five minutes, by day or night. To do this, there was a requirement for the DZs to be clearly marked, to ensure that the crews had an easily identified reference point to allow them to drop accurately and consistently. With the demise of the 16th Parachute Brigade in 1977, the disbandment of No 1 (Guards) Independent Company meant that the expertise had been lost. Regimental Headquarters was asked to look at the options for providing this capability. Major Phil Neame produced a paper in October 1984 recommending the formation of an independent platoon, with manpower drawn from all three battalions and coming directly under the command of the Brigade Headquarters. It would number a total of 28 in 7 patrols of 4 men and include 2 Royal Signals operators.

Today, the Pathfinder Platoon is made up of selected personnel from the armed forces, who have undergone a rigorous selection and training programme. The Group is formed around a platoon to company strength cadre of reconnaissance and communications specialists. Its roles include locating and marking parachute drop zones and tactical and helicopter landing zones for air landing operations. Once the main force has landed, the group provides tactical intelligence to assist operational decision-making within the brigade headquarters. The pathfinders can utilise various airborne insertion techniques, which range from the current in-service Low Level Parachute (LLP), to High Altitude Low Opening (HALO) and High Altitude High Opening (HAHO) systems.

Traditions

The numeral 16 is derived from the 1st Airborne Division and 6th Airborne Division of the Second World War, first used by the 16th Parachute Brigade formed in 1948.

The brigade's original emblem was a light-blue and maroon shield with a light blue Striking Eagle outlined in maroon emblazoned upon it, and was adopted from the Special Training Centre in Lochailort, Scotland, where Special Forces and Airborne troops were trained between 1943 and 1945. The sign was worn on the left arm. The colours chosen were traditional and showed the make-up of the brigade, maroon for Airborne and light-blue for Army Air Corps.

The symbol of 5 Airborne Brigade had been Bellerophon on top of Pegasus (a winged horse of Greek mythology) and became synonymous with British airborne forces during World War II. When 16 Air Assault Brigade was formed there was some controversy when the Parachute units of 5 Airborne had to give up the Pegasus symbol and replace it with the Striking Eagle symbol.

However, following Army 2020 restructuring, command of 16 Air Assault Brigade was transferred from Joint Helicopter Command to Commander Field Army, and the Pegasus emblem returned as the symbol of British airborne forces on 25 November 2015.

Current composition 
The current composition of the brigade after the Future Soldier modernisation:

 Headquarters, 16th Air Assault Brigade, at Merville Barracks, Colchester Garrison
 2nd Battalion, The Parachute Regiment (Airborne Infantry), at Merville Barracks, Colchester Garrison
 3rd Battalion, The Parachute Regiment (Airborne Infantry, at Merville Barracks, Colchester Garrison
 4th Battalion, The Parachute Regiment (Army Reserve), at Thornbury Barracks, Pudsey
 2nd Battalion, The Royal Gurkha Rifles (Air Assault Infantry), at British Forces Brunei (Will restructure to Folkestone in 2022)
 1st Battalion, The Royal Irish Regiment (27th (Inniskilling), 83rd, 87th and The Ulster Defence Regiment) (Light Recce Strike Infantry), at Clive Barracks, Tern Hil (Will restructure to Edinburgh by 2027)
 7th Parachute Regiment, Royal Horse Artillery (Airborne Close Support Artillery), at Merville Barracks, Colchester Garrison (12 x L118 105mm light guns) 
 23rd Parachute Engineer Regiment, Royal Engineers (Close Support Air Manoeuvre Engineers), at Rock Barracks, Woodbridge
 299 Parachute Squadron (Army Reserve), in Wakefield, Gateshead, and Woodbridge
13th Air Assault Support Regiment, Royal Logistic Corps (Air Assault Logistics), at Merville Barracks, Colchester Garrison
16th Medical Regiment, Royal Army Medical Corps (Air Manoeuvre Medical Regiment), at Merville Barracks, Colchester Garrison
 144 Parachute Medical Squadron (Army Reserve), in London, Cardiff, Glasgow, and Nottingham
 216 Parachute Signal Squadron, Royal Corps of Signals (Communication and Information Support), at Merville Barracks, Colchester Garrison
 The Pathfinder Platoon (Pathfinders), at Merville Barracks, Colchester Garrison

Commanders
Commanders have included:
1999–2000 Brigadier Peter Wall (late Royal Engineers)
2000–2002 Brigadier Barney White-Spunner (late Blues and Royals)
2002–2004 Brigadier Jacko Page (late Parachute Regiment)
2004–2007 Brigadier Ed Butler (late Royal Green Jackets)
2007–2008 Brigadier Mark Carleton-Smith (late Irish Guards)
2008–2011 Brigadier James Chiswell (late Parachute Regiment)
2011–2013 Brigadier Giles Hill (late Parachute Regiment)
2013–2015 Brigadier Nick Borton (late Royal Regiment of Scotland)
2015–2017 Brigadier Colin Weir (late Royal Irish)
2017–2019 Brigadier Nick Perry (late King's Royal Hussars)
2019–2020 Brigadier John Clark (late Royal Engineers)
2020–2021 Brigadier James Martin (late Princess of Wales's Royal Regiment)
2021 – present Brigadier Nick Cowley (late The Queen's Royal Hussars)

See also

 1st Airborne Division
 6th Airborne Division

Footnotes

References

External links 

 

Military units and formations established in 1999
Airborne infantry brigades of the United Kingdom
Military units and formations of the United Kingdom in the War in Afghanistan (2001–2021)
Military units and formations of the Iraq War
1999 establishments in the United Kingdom
Future Soldier